Esmailabad-e Gorji (also Romanized as Esmā‘īlābād-e Gorjī; also known as Esmā‘īlābād-e Kalālī and Esmā‘īlābād) is a village in Mian Jam Rural District, in the Central District of Torbat-e Jam County, Razavi Khorasan Province, Iran. At the 2006 census, its population was 776, in 188 families.

References 

Populated places in Torbat-e Jam County